Grace Eveyln Manson (1893–1967) was an American psychologist known for her work as an occupational psychologist.

Early life and education 
Manson was born on July 15, 1893 in Baltimore, Maryland. Educated at Goucher College, where she received her AB in 1915, and Columbia University, where she received her AM in 1919, she went on to earn a Ph.D. from the Carnegie Institute of Technology (now Carnegie Mellon University) in 1923.

Career and research 
She began her career in research at the University of Michigan, where she was a researcher from 1923 to 1926 and a research associate from 1926 to 1930. Manson then moved to Northwestern University, where she was a psychology professor and the director of personnel research. She remained there until 1944, when she became a civil servant, and worked for the Veterans Administration and Social Security Administration. Her research focused on selection techniques, differential psychology, and personnel research and included statistics on women's occupations, earnings, and vocational interests. She was a highly cited researcher in her era. She was a member of the American Psychological Association.

References

Bibliography

20th-century American psychologists
American women psychologists
20th-century American women scientists
Goucher College alumni
Columbia University alumni
Carnegie Mellon University alumni
1893 births
1967 deaths